Theocharis Iliadis (born 5 September 1996) is a Greek professional footballer who plays as a centre-back for Super League 2 club AEL.

References

1996 births
Living people
Greek footballers
Greek expatriate footballers
Gamma Ethniki players
Regionalliga players
Football League (Greece) players
Super League Greece players
Super League Greece 2 players
FSV Budissa Bautzen players
Volos N.F.C. players
Pierikos F.C. players
Diagoras F.C. players
Athlitiki Enosi Larissa F.C. players
Association football defenders
Footballers from Katerini